Patrizio Parrini (born 5 September 1959) is a former professional tennis player from Italy.

Career
Parrini was a doubles semi-finalist, with partner Gianluca Rinaldini, at the Alitalia Open in 1981.

He played Spaniard Gabriel Urpí in the first round of the 1982 French Open and was defeated in four sets. In his seven other appearances on the Grand Prix tennis circuit he was also unable to register a win.

He retired from the professional tour in 1987, at 28.

Challenger titles

Doubles: (2)

References

External links
 
 

1959 births
Living people
Italian male tennis players
Mediterranean Games gold medalists for Italy
Mediterranean Games medalists in tennis
Competitors at the 1979 Mediterranean Games
20th-century Italian people